Mildred Horn (January 4, 1901 – June 7, 1998) was an American film critic and screenwriter, best known for her work on the Kroger Babb exploitation film Mom and Dad.

Biography 
Horn was born in Erie, Pennsylvania, and studied at Academy High School. She later moved to Indianapolis, Indiana, where she became a film critic for a local paper.

When Horn was sent to review Kroger Babb's production of Child Bride, she was horrified that such a "cheap, crude, mislabeled morality play would be shown in a major Indiana family theater." In Horn's opinion, the film was material for a shoddy sideshow tent at some backwoods county fair.

Babb later met with Horn, and instead of Horn writing a scathing review, they entered into a personal and professional relationship that would last 40 years until his death in 1980. They enjoyed a common-law marriage after 1944, only making it official when Babb's first wife, Toby, consented to a divorce in the late '60s.

Together with Jack Jossey, they formed Hygienic Productions (later renamed Hallmark Productions), and she wrote the screenplay for their best-known production, Mom and Dad. The film was presented in a unique way, and included lectures and the sale of hygiene books that Horn wrote.

Horn also wrote the screenplays for Why Men Leave Home, a film about female beauty, and Prince of Peace, a passion play.

Selected works

Films
 Mom and Dad, screenplay (1945)
 The Prince of Peace, aka The Lawton Story, screenplay (1949)
 Why Men Leave Home, aka Secrets of Beauty,  screenplay (1951)

Books
 Man and Boy (1944)
 Woman and Girl (1944)

References

1901 births
1998 deaths
Screenwriters from Pennsylvania
Writers from Erie, Pennsylvania
American women screenwriters
20th-century American women writers
20th-century American screenwriters